Horacio Muñoz Muñoz  (18 May 1896 – 23 October 1976) was a Chilean football defender. He played in the 1917 South American Championship, as well as the 1919 and 1920 editions of the same tournament. He was in the Chile squad for the 1930 FIFA World Cup but he failed to make an appearance in the tournament.

References

External links

Chilean footballers
Chile international footballers
C.D. Arturo Fernández Vial footballers
1930 FIFA World Cup players
1896 births
1976 deaths
Association football defenders